Speichersdorf is a municipality  in the district of Bayreuth in Bavaria in Germany. It is situated near the Fichtelgebirge, 18 km eastern of Bayreuth. It has a population of about 6,200.

References

External links
Official website (German)

Bayreuth (district)